The Solent Sea Steam Packet Company, later the Solent Steam Packet Company, operated ferry services between Lymington and Yarmouth on the Isle of Wight between 1841 and 1884.

History

In early 1841, the company purchased Glasgow from the Lymington, Yarmouth, Cowes and Portsmouth Steam Packet Company, and after refitting, was deployed on the service between Lymington and Yarmouth, operating three or four passages a day.

In March 1841 they entered into a contract with the Post Office for the conveyance of mail between Lymington and Yarmouth.

By 1842, the company had acquired another vessel, Solent, which was running from Lymington to Yarmouth, Cowes, Ryde and Portsmouth.

In 1858, Red Lion was added to the fleet to handle additional traffic brought by the railway. The company changed its name to the Solent Steam Packet Company in 1861.

A second Solent replaced the first on 3 November 1863. Mayflower joined the fleet on 6 July 1866 had been built in Newcastle; she was tastefully fitted and comfortable. As well as plying to Yarmouth, she made excursion runs to Bournemouth, but was disposed of after 1878.

On 1 July 1884, the London and South Western Railway bought out the Solent Steam Packet Company's fleet of two paddle steamers, Solent and Mayflower, four horse and cargo boats, and other boats and property, paying £2,750 (equivalent to £ in ).

Ships
The vessels operated by the Solent Sea Steam Packet Company were:

References

Ferry transport in England
Isle of Wight
Defunct shipping companies of the United Kingdom
Lymington
British companies established in 1841
Transport companies established in 1841